Thamnochortus cinereus is a species of grass-like restio of the family Restionaceae. It grows in the fynbos region in South Africa. It is known as the silver reed in English and Silverriet in Afrikaans.

Description

This is a 'tufted' restio, somewhat rush-like in appearance; it looks like a miniature version of larger restio species such as Elegia capensis.

References 

Restionaceae
Endemic flora of South Africa
Flora of the Cape Provinces
Fynbos